Monea is a closed railway station located in the township of Monea, on the Albury-Wodonga railway line in Victoria, Australia.

The station was opened in February 1882 to serve firewood traffic from the surrounding area, and had only a loop siding and single platform. By 1887 there were three sawmills located on the siding, as well as two more nearby. The station closed to all traffic in June 1960 and by the 1970s little trace remained.

References

Disused railway stations in Victoria (Australia)